Tom Clancy's Splinter Cell: Conviction is an action-adventure stealth video game developed by Ubisoft Montreal and published by Microsoft Game Studios and Ubisoft as part of the Tom Clancy's Splinter Cell series. Key members of the Tom Clancy's Rainbow Six: Vegas team, such as creative director Maxime Béland worked on the game. Gameloft released a handheld version for Apple's iOS on May 27, 2010. There are also versions available for the Android, Windows Phone and Bada, as well as a side-scrolling 2D version for mobile phones. The game was followed by a sequel in 2013 titled Splinter Cell: Blacklist.

The game received positive reviews from critics with praise of its polished gameplay, art direction, and engaging narrative, although there was criticism on the short length of the campaign, and departure from stealth genre as compared to previous titles.

Gameplay

Splinter Cell: Conviction introduces a number of new gameplay features to the Splinter Cell series, one of which is the "Mark & Execute" feature, which allows the player to mark specific targets, such as enemies or objects, and shoot them in rapid succession without manually targeting each one. The player can choose to prioritize these targets, so that, for example, he can distract one guard by shooting out a light in his vicinity and then take out another guard. Another new feature is the "Last Known Position", which occurs when the player breaks the line of sight of an alerted guard. This creates a visual silhouette where the guard thinks Sam is, allowing the player to flank his enemies.

Other new features include the ability to interrogate characters in real-time, and use objects in the surrounding environment against them. Mission objectives and key plot points are projected onto walls within the in-game world, in order to keep the player immersed in the gameplay. Several other features, such as blending into crowds, improvising gadgets, and interaction with the environment, were announced, and according to creative director Maxime Béland would have given the game "a lot of Bourne Identity influence," but were scrapped after the development team decided that going in this direction would be taking too much of a risk.

Some of the features that were present in the last four games in the series do not appear in this game. Sam's hybrid night/heat vision goggles and his multipurpose SC-20K assault rifle, which were the mainstay of the last four games, no longer appear. However, he can equip sonar goggles in the later stages of the game. His light sensor is also absent, although change in the screen saturation now shows whether Sam is hidden from view. Sam can no longer move or hide dead bodies, nor can he knock enemies unconscious, as all equipment that helped doing the latter are absent. Lock picking and hacking minigames are also not included in the game. Sam has been equipped with pistols with unlimited ammo and suppressors, which helps him to takedown his enemies in a stealthy way.

One of Ubisoft's stated goals for Conviction was to make the game more accessible. According to Béland, Chaos Theory is "very hardcore", which turned off many players and disconnected people from the fantasy of being Sam Fisher. Béland contrasted the earlier games in the series with works containing James Bond or Jason Bourne, who "run fast, they don't make noise, they kill one, two, three or four guys super quickly," and he stated that Conviction delivers a similarly dynamic experience with more of an emphasis on action than previous Splinter Cell games.

Multiplayer
Multiplayer mode in Splinter Cell: Conviction involves both split screen, System link (Xbox 360), and online cooperative mode, plus a "Deniable Ops" mode, involving four modes that pit players against AI enemies in game modes such as "Hunter" (where the player must kill a set number of enemies), "Infiltration" (where the player must kill a set number of enemies without being seen), "Last Stand" (where the player must protect a bomb as enemies try to disarm it), and "Face-Off" (a competitive version of "Hunter"). "Face-Off" is the game's only competitive multiplayer mode, as it features the ability to kill the opposing player. "Hunter", "Infiltration", and "Last Stand" can be played in single-player modes and do not always have to be played with a human partner. The game does not contain the "Spies Vs Mercenaries" mode featured in the previous games of the series.

According to co-op game director Patrick Redding, the stealth in Conviction is designed around new core elements like "Mark & Execute" and "Last Known Position".

Plot
The game's story is divided into two portions. The main portion is the game's single-player campaign, which puts the player in control of Sam Fisher three years after the events of Splinter Cell: Double Agent. The "Prologue" portion of the game, meanwhile, is accessed through the multiplayer co-op mode, which puts two players in control of agents Archer and Kestrel 10 days before the campaign starts.

Prologue

Third Echelon agent "Archer" and his Russian partner, Voron agent "Kestrel" are deployed to Nevsky Prospekt in Saint Petersburg, Russia to halt rogue elements of the Russian military from selling advanced warheads on the black market. Intelligence from criminal Andriy Kobin points to drug and human trafficker Valentin Lesovsky as the broker for the sale, and Archer and Kestrel are tasked with terminating Lesovsky and his associate, Boris Sychev, as well as gaining Lesovsky's contact list.

Having completed their mission, Archer and Kestrel are then deployed to the Russian embassy in Baku, Azerbaijan to gather intelligence on an arms deal conducted by former Russian GRU Colonel Leonid Bykhov. They observe the deal and witness Bhykov betray his associate, Tagizade, ordering his men to kill him. Archer and Kestrel prevent the destruction of the weapons crates, learning that the weapons Bhykov was going to sell were Block II JDAM missile guidance kits. They interrogate Bhykov, learning that he is working with Major General Kerzakov, who is in the Yastreb Complex, an underground fortress situated underneath Moscow's Red Square.

They infiltrate the complex and learn the location of the EMP warheads. They render the JDAM kits inoperable by using their portable EMP devices, and download data from multiple servers to trace the EMP devices to the Mozdok Proving Grounds. Sneaking aboard a supply truck, they infiltrate the Proving Grounds and secure the EMP devices with the help of Kobin. During their extraction, Third Echelon director Tom Reed contacts Archer and orders him to kill Kestrel; concurrently, Kestrel reads Archer's OPSAT device, forcing him to act in self-defense. Whilst either player can die, the canon ending has Kestrel fatally shooting Archer; overcome with grief and unaware of Kobin’s presence, Kestrel is shot in the head.

Main game
Private military company Black Arrow interrogates Sam Fisher’s former Navy SEAL squadmate Victor Coste, who begins to recount the events of the last few days.

After quitting Third Echelon, Fisher heads to Valletta, Malta, to investigate rumors that the hit-and-run death of his daughter, Sarah, might not have been an accident. Suddenly, Anna "Grim" Grímsdóttir, Sam's former colleague, contacts him and warns him of an imminent attack by a group of hitmen. Sam neutralizes them and goes after their contractor, Kobin, who was the true culprit behind Sarah's death. He infiltrates Kobin's mansion, kills his guards, and begins to interrogate  him, but a Third Echelon Splinter Cell team subdues him before he can extract anything useful.

Grim and Black Arrow bring Sam to Price Airfield in Virginia, where they are to interrogate him. However, Grim releases Sam, revealing that she is working undercover for U.S. President Patricia Caldwell, investigating suspicious circumstances concerning Director Reed, Black Arrow, and the stolen Russian EMP technology. She reveals that Sarah is still alive and helps Sam escape the airfield.

Sam then contacts and arranges to meet with Coste at the Washington Monument to receive some equipment. He also learns that Lucius Galliard, CEO of Black Arrow, has tasked them to provide security for White Box Technologies, his recently purchased R&D company specializing in EMP technology. Sam infiltrates White Box Technologies and witnesses Black Arrow mercenaries purging scientists that are no longer needed. He hacks a high-security White Box computer and retrieves strategic data about an operation involving EMPs for Grim's analysts to study. He escapes the facility after fighting through more Black Arrow mercenaries, triggering an EMP to cover his tracks. Later, President Caldwell directs him to the Lincoln Memorial to eavesdrop on Reed and Galliard. The conversation and the subsequent interrogation of Galliard reveal that a group called "Megiddo" funds and organizes the operation, which is to take place in 24 hours. However, a hitman shoots Galliard dead before running away; Sam gives chase, but a car bomb ultimately kills the assassin.

Sam then heads to Third Echelon headquarters where he receives a set of advanced sonar goggles from Grim's friend Charlie Fryman, and raids Reed's office for information. However, Sam finds Kobin there and interrogates him. Kobin reveals that Reed works for Megiddo, and is planning to activate three massive EMP devices in Washington DC and assassinate Caldwell in the ensuing chaos, allowing Vice President Calvin Samson to take over the presidency. Reed would then get a promotion in return. Kobin also reveals that it was Grim who gave him orders to fake Sarah's death. Grim confirms this by playing an audio recording of deceased former director Irving Lambert where he reveals that he discovered a mole in Third Echelon who was plotting to threaten Sarah's safety and use her as leverage against Sam. Although Lambert successfully staged Sarah's death to foil this plan, he was unable to identify the mole. Grim urges an enraged Sam to destroy the EMP device in the Michigan Avenue Reservoir, as Sarah's apartment is within its blast radius. At this time, the Third Echelon building's self-destruct protocol activates, and Sam escapes before the building explodes.

With the aid of Coste, Sam attacks the Michigan Avenue Reservoir. After fighting through the Black Arrow mercenaries defending the site, Sam marks the EMP generators for Coste to destroy from the air. Sam is then extracted by Coste and reunites with Sarah before the two remaining EMPs are activated, destroying most of the electronic defenses in the city and causing chaos. Shortly afterward, a surface-to-air missile takes down Coste's helicopter, but all three survive. While Coste takes Sarah to safety, Sam journeys through downtown Washington to make his way to the White House, which has been overrun by Black Arrow mercenaries and Third Echelon operatives. After he confronts and incapacitates the corrupt Vice President, Sam regroups with Grim.

As Grim and Sam must enter the Oval Office without alarming Reed, who may kill the President, Grim shoots Sam in the shoulder and pretends to detain him at gunpoint, allowing them to enter the Oval Office safely. Reed prepares to execute Sam and the President, revealing that Caldwell was going to shut down Third Echelon after Lambert's death. Reed then plans to frame Sam for assassinating Caldwell as supposed proof that Third Echelon is still needed. Sam and Grim then spring into action, disarming Reed and killing his escorts. Sam interrogates Reed while United States Army soldiers extract Caldwell. Reed finally reveals himself to be the very mole Lambert was investigating. At this point, Sam or Grim executes Reed depending on the player's choice. Canonically, Grim executes Reed.

As Coste begins to wrap up his story, he states that Sam, in his last conversation, promised to protect him just as he would his brother. At that moment, the interrogators hear an alarm, followed by an explosion and gunfire in the background. They abandon the interview and leave Coste behind.

Development
The existence of a sequel to Double Agent was leaked to the internet on September 21, 2006 through a 2GB rar file containing, among other media, 75 concept art images of as-yet unannounced next-generation games uploaded to Ubisoft's public FTP site. The leaked images showed gloomy images of the Washington Monument under military occupation, as well as roadside views of Washington, D.C.

Conviction was officially announced on May 23, 2007 when Ubisoft released a trailer for the game. It depicted a more rugged-looking Sam with long hair and a fully-grown beard. He had the ability to blend in with the environment, interact with tables and chairs and utilize hand-to-hand combat against enemies, making the game appear less stealth-based than previous games. The lighting and shadow effects also showed a vast improvement over Double Agent. The game was originally due for release on November 16, 2007. However, it missed its initial launch date, and on May 19, 2008, Xbox World reported that Splinter Cell: Conviction was "officially on hold," and had been taken "back to the drawing board." While Ubisoft never confirmed this, they did announce that the game had been pushed back to the 2009-2010 fiscal year.

The game resurfaced at E3 2009, with a completely new visual style and a more casual-looking Sam. The developers confirmed that the "new" Conviction had been in development since early 2008, commenting that "the gameplay has evolved a lot" and "the visual direction is simply much better." The game was given a November 2009 release date at E3, but was later pushed back to the first quarter of 2010. After initially announcing a release date of February 23, Ubisoft delayed the game again until April. On February 4, 2010, Ubisoft officially announced that the game would be released on April 13 for the Xbox 360.

Conviction supports AMD's multi-monitor-technology Eyefinity.

Audio
On July 16, 2007, it was announced that composers Kaveh Cohen and Michael Nielsen, in association with music house Groove Worx, would be composing the score to Conviction, their first score for a video game. On October 25, 2007, Soundtrack.net posted a news item from the scoring session for the game, featuring photographs of the orchestral recording of the music. On January 28, 2010, a message was posted on Amon Tobin's website, stating that he would contribute to the game.

On March 29, 2010, it was revealed in an interview that Michael Ironside considered not returning to the role as Sam Fisher as a result of not being able to add more to the character. However, he changed his mind when Ubisoft sent him a copy of the script.

Release

Retail versions
Splinter Cell: Conviction is available on the Xbox 360 and Microsoft Windows platforms, as well as mobile versions for the iOS and Java ME. Ubisoft has stated that it has no plans to release it on the PlayStation 3 with Max Béland, the creative director of Splinter Cell further stating; "Well, Splinter Cell was originally built on Xbox and we've had a great relationship with Microsoft. So Conviction is an exclusive for 360, it's not going to go to PS3." The PC version implemented Ubisoft's new DRM, which requires a permanent internet connection.

Conviction was released in four retail versions. As well as the standard version, a Special Edition, a Collector's Edition, and a Limited Collector's Edition were also released.

The Special Edition, called Shadow Edition, was exclusive to Britain, specifically, Game, Gamestation and Gameplay, and featured alternate box art, a SPAS-12 silenced shotgun, early in-game access to the SC3000 and a special "Shadow Armor" playable skin. Pre-orders also included Tom Clancy's Splinter Cell: Conviction Projector Torch.

The Collector's Edition was exclusive to the United States and Canada, and featured a USB flash drive, an artbook based on the Splinter Cell series, two decal stickers, a comic book detailing the events leading up to Conviction, and two in-game items: an MP5-SD3 sub-machine gun and a Third Echelon spy suit. Due to a number of defective USB drives, Ubisoft lowered the price of the collector's edition by $10.

The Limited Collector's Edition was exclusive to European, Middle Eastern, Asian and Pacific territories. It included a high quality edition box with a Sam Fisher figurine, steel-book DVD case with the game disc, manual and game soundtrack CD (24 tracks), and a card with 5 bonus in-game content codes: for the MP-5 sub-machine gun, SC-3000 assault rifle, SMG-2 machine pistol, "Infiltration" game mode and the Shadow Armor outfit.

Some individual stores also released their own variations. GameStop pre-orders included a SPAS-12 silenced shotgun code. Best Buy pre-orders included a SC-3000 assault rifle code. Amazon.co.uk released its own Limited Edition which contained the standard version of the game, a separate DVD case called "Exclusive Pre-order Pack" and the SPAS-12 code, a 32-page comic book ("Digging in the Ashes") and a DVD detailing the making of the game. Play.com's version of the game contained the standard edition, plus Tom Clancy's Splinter Cell: Conviction carabiner torch.

In March 2010, Microsoft announced a special limited edition black Xbox 360 Elite console for Tom Clancy's Splinter Cell: Conviction. The unit includes a 250 GB hard drive, two black wireless controllers, a black wired headset, an ethernet cable, a standard definition composite A/V cable, and the standard edition of the game.

Ports
On May 27, 2010, a version of the game was released for the iOS. Developed and published by Gameloft, it featured very similar gameplay, with the biggest difference being a simplification of the story, omitting the entire prologue, and many individual scenes and characters from the main game. It did however feature an exclusive level not found in the original game - a speed boat level set on the Potomac River.

In June 2010, Ubisoft announced a version for the Mac OS X. It was set for release on October 19, 2010, but was delayed until February 17, 2011.

A port was released as part of the Windows Phone "Must Have Games" promotion on February 22, 2012.

Downloadable content
Splinter Cell: Conviction released weekly unlockable content every Thursday through the in-game "Extras" menu. The content included weapons, gadgets, multiplayer skins and Deniable Ops maps. Conviction also continued with Ubisoft's new Uplay downloadable rewards program. With Uplay, players earn units for completing set in-game tasks that can be used to purchase various content in Splinter Cell, or saved for content in future Ubisoft releases. On May 27, 2010, the only official DLC map pack was released, titled "The Insurgency Pack." It features four new levels for the Deniable Ops mode, and nine new Achievements worth a total of 250 Gamerscore.

Ghost Recon: Future Soldier multiplayer beta

On April 19, 2012, a closed multiplayer beta was made available to owners of Splinter Cell: Conviction on Xbox 360 for the upcoming installment in the Ghost Recon series, as well as people who preordered the game from GameStop or PlayStation Plus members.

Soundtrack

Original Soundtrack

On April 13, 2010, Ubisoft Music in conjunction with composers Michael Nielsen and Kaveh Cohen released a 16-track Official Soundtrack to Splinter Cell: Conviction exclusively via iTunes.

With the release of the Limited Collector's Edition of Splinter Cell: Conviction, the "Original Soundtrack" CD by Michael Nielsen and Kaveh Cohen was included, featuring one track composed and produced by Amon Tobin, who had previously composed the soundtrack to Chaos Theory. No track list is incorporated onto the CD or packaging. However, on April 18, 2010, Nielson posted a track list for the CD on his Myspace page.

On April 20, 2010, a news bulletin was posted on Amon Tobin's website following the release of what is understood to be the majority of his contributions to the Splinter Cell: Convictions score.

Reception

Critical reception

Conviction has received mostly positive feedback from critics on Xbox 360 and PC.

IGN's Alec Meer awarded it a score of 9.3 out of 10 and gave it an "Editor's Choice Award." Edge magazine's Tim Ingham awarded Conviction 8/10 in a lead review, claiming that the title is "in reach of greatness." He was particularly impressed with Sam Fisher's ability to turn any environment into "torture chambers" at the press of a button. The main points of criticism were its short length and that too much of the title is played in monochrome. GameSpot's Kevin Van Ord awarded the game a score of 8 out of 10, praising its cooperative mode and storytelling, but criticizing its short length and slimmed-down stealth elements, as well as most of the interrogation sections, stating that interrogations were a "missed opportunity" and "more predictable than provocative." GameTrailers gave it an 8.9 out of 10 praising the "top-notch voice acting" and the game as a whole, saying "Conviction is a gripping new chapter in the Splinter Cell saga." Game Informer gave the game a 9 out of 10 and GamePro gave it a 5 out of 5.

Conviction had a less welcome reception with some PC reviewers. GameSpot's Kevin Van Ord scored it 6.5/10, citing bugs, missing features, connection issues and a higher price than a typical PC game. PC Gamer UK gave a score of 87/100, but wrote "we can't recommend you buy this game with the current DRM."

Sales
486,000 copies of the game were sold in April 2010 in the U.S., which made it the best-selling game for that month.

By July 2010, the game had sold 1.9 million copies on PC and Xbox 360.

Notes

References

External links
Tom Clancy's Splinter Cell: Conviction at MobyGames

2010 video games
Android (operating system) games
Bada games
IOS games
MacOS games
Multiplayer and single-player video games
Split-screen multiplayer games
Tom Clancy games
Tom Clancy's Splinter Cell
Ubisoft games
Unreal Engine games
Video games developed in Canada
Video games scored by Amon Tobin
Video games set in Azerbaijan
Video games set in Iraq
Video games set in Maine
Video games set in Malta
Video games set in Moscow
Video games set in New Orleans
Video games set in Russia
Video games set in Saint Petersburg
Video games set in San Francisco
Video games set in Utah
Video games set in Virginia
Video games set in Washington, D.C.
Video games set in the 1990s
Video games using Havok
Windows games
Windows Phone games
Xbox 360 games
Gulf War video games
Video games with alternative versions
J2ME games
Cancelled Nintendo DS games
Gameloft games